The Nikon 1-mount is a type of interchangeable lens mount developed by Nikon for its Nikon CX format mirrorless interchangeable-lens cameras. The 1-mount was first introduced on the Nikon 1 series in 2011, and features a bayonet mount.

Compatibility to Nikon F-mount 
The F-mount adapter FT1 enables the use of all F-mount lenses especially with integrated autofocus motor. The FT1 adapter mounts and meters with all AI-P, AF, AF-S, D and G lenses and compatibles providing autofocus with all lenses with integrated autofocus motor. It further mounts Pre-AI, AI, AI-S and E lenses without metering as well as lenses which jut out the F-mount (needing mirror lock-up on cameras with mirror). Also although not recommended, it is used with teleconverters for extreme telephotos.

Lenses

Zoom lenses

Power zoom lenses

Prime lenses

All-weather lens
Lenses are optically identical to their non-sealed counterparts and use the same bayonet, but have an extended flange to ensure a watertight seal with the Nikon 1 AW1 body.

Third party lens

Future lenses
At the Nikon 1 launch in October 2011, Nikon showcased seven prototype lenses. As of October 2012, five of these prototypes have become official.

Nikon discontinued the Nikon 1 line in 2018, including cancelling any future lens releases.

See also
Nikon CX format
Image sensor format
Nikkor

References

External links
 Advanced Camera with Interchangeable Lens Nikon 1 J1 / V1 Nikon
 Full list of 1 Nikkor lenses at Nikon USA

Lens mounts